Jism may refer to:
 a slang word for semen
 an Arabic (جسم), Hindi (जिस्म), and Urdu (جسم) word for "body"
 Jism (2003 film), a Bollywood erotic thriller film
 Jism 2,  a 2012 erotic thriller and sequel to the 2003 Bollywood film
 Jism (2006 film), a Pakistani film
 Jism (2016 film), a Nepali film
 "Jism", a song by the rock band Tindersticks from their self-titled debut album